The inaugural Copa Independencia tournament was held on September 26, 2007 at the Los Angeles Memorial Coliseum. The tournament featured clubs from El Salvador, Guatemala, Honduras, and Mexico.

Competing clubs
 Club Deportivo FAS
 Club Deportivo Marquense
 Club Deportivo Marathón
 Club Santos Laguna

Tournament Format
The tournament is a one-day, two round event where the two winning teams of the first round face off in a second round penalty shoot out to determine the champion.

First round

Second round

Champion

See also
Federación Mexicana de Fútbol
Federación Nacional de Fútbol de Guatemala
Federación Salvadoreña de Fútbol
Liga Nacional de Fútbol de Honduras

External links
Club Deportivo F.A.S.
Club Deportivo Marquense
Club Santos Laguna
CONCACAF
UNCAF
Federación Mexicana de Fútbol
Federación Nacional de Fútbol de Guatemala
Federación Salvadoreña de Fútbol
Liga Nacional de Fútbol de Honduras

2007
2007–08 in Mexican football
2007 in Central American football
2007 in sports in California
Sports competitions in Los Angeles